Su Boyang (born 20 January 1989) is a Chinese football goalkeeper who currently is a Free agent.

Club career
Su Boyang started his professional football career in 2010 when he was loaned to Beijing Guoan's satellite team Beijing Guoan Talent, which would play as a foreign team in Singapore's S. League in the 2010 season. Playing as the captain of the team, Su made his senior debut in a 1–0 home defeat against Étoile FC on 12 February 2010. On 7 September 2010, the club was involved in a brawl during a match with Young Lions at Jalan Besar Stadium. He was suspended from playing or participating football for 8 months and being fined S$2,000 by Football Association of Singapore (FAS) for participating the brawl.

Su joined China League One newcomer Guizhou Zhicheng in 2011 after he was released by Beijing Guoan. He transferred to China League Two side Hebei Zhongji in January 2012. He made his debut for Hebei on 28 April 2012 in a 1–0 away win against Shandong Youth. He lost his position to Sui Weijie in the second half of 2013 season when he asked for leave to get married.

In January 2014, Su returned to Guizhou Zhicheng who played at China League Two. He played as the first choice of the club as Guizhou returned to the second tier in 2015. Su conceded 21 goals and saved three penalties in 26 league appearances in the 2016 season as Guizhou won the runners-up of the league and won promotion to the Chinese Super League. He was named as a candidate for 2016 Goalkeeper of League One award but lost out to Zhang Lu.

Su extended his contract with Guizhou on 14 January 2017. He made his Super League debut on 3 March 2017 in a 1–1 home draw against Liaoning FC. After six seasons with the club he left on 1 January 2020.

Career statistics
.

References

External links
 

1989 births
Living people
Chinese footballers
Footballers from Beijing
Association football goalkeepers
Chinese Super League players
China League One players
China League Two players
Singapore Premier League players
Hebei F.C. players
Guizhou F.C. players